Ray or Raymond Martinez may refer to:

Ray Martínez (born 1950), Cuban musician
Ray Martinez (politician), member of the Arizona House of Representatives
Ray Martinez, British guitarist, session musician and member of the band Spring (1971-1972)
Raymond P. Martinez, American government official

See also
Ramon Martinez (disambiguation)
Martínez (surname)